A deputy chief of mission (DCM, in Europe the term deputy head of mission – DHoM or DHM is used instead) is the number-two diplomat assigned to an embassy or other diplomatic mission. The deputy chief of mission is usually considered the second-in-command to the head of mission (usually an ambassador). DCMs serve as chargé d'affaires (that is, as acting chief of mission) when the titular head of mission is outside the host country or when the post is vacant.

DCMs typically serve as a key advisor to the chief of mission as well as a chief of staff, responsible for the day-to-day management of the post.  The DCM will oversee the heads of sections (political, economic, public affairs, management, consular) at the embassy, such as the DCMs also serve as de facto ombudsmen, responding to employee concerns and quality of life issues. Most career ambassadors have served as a DCM prior to their first assignment as chief of mission.

In circumstances where the ambassador is not a career diplomat (such as the US Ambassador to the United Kingdom, who has often been a political fundraiser for the US President) the role of the DCM may increase, with a senior diplomat occupying the role.

References
 

Diplomats by role
Vice offices